Nanohyla annectens, the Larut Hills rice frog, is a species of frog in the family Microhylidae. It is found in Peninsular Malaysia; records from Thailand and elsewhere probably refer to other species.
Its natural habitats are evergreen submontane and montane rainforests. It lives on the forest floor and in puddles and breeds in temporary pools. It is locally threatened by habitat loss.

Taxonomy 
The Larut Hills rice frog used to be placed in the genus Microhyla, but a 2021 study using morphological and phylogenetic evidence moved nine species (including N. annectens) to a new genus, Nanohyla.

References

External links
Amphibian and Reptiles of Peninsular Malaysia - Microhyla annectens

annectens
Amphibians described in 1900
Amphibians of Malaysia
Endemic fauna of Malaysia
Taxonomy articles created by Polbot